De Pere is a city located in Brown County, Wisconsin, United States. The population was 25,410 according to the 2020 Census. De Pere is part of the Green Bay Metropolitan Statistical Area.

History
At the arrival of the first European, Jean Nicolet, who visited the place in 1634–1635, De Pere was the site of a polyglot settlement of several thousand attracted by the fishing at the first rapids of the Fox River. In 1671 French Jesuit explorer Père Claude-Jean Allouez founded the St. Francis Xavier Mission at the last set of rapids on the Fox River before it enters The Bay of Green Bay. The site was known as Rapides Des Pères (rapids of the fathers) which became modern day De Pere.

The present city of De Pere had its beginnings in 1836, when John Penn Arndt and Charles Tullar incorporated the De Pere Hydraulic Company and drew up the first plat of the town. In 1837, a popular vote established De Pere as the county seat of Brown County. It maintained this position until 1854, when another election moved the county seat to Green Bay. De Pere was incorporated as a village on March 6, 1857.

Originally De Pere consisted solely of the community on the east side of the river. West De Pere on the west side of the river was a town. In 1870 the Village of West De Pere was incorporated; in 1883 the Village of West De Pere became the City of Nicolet after voyageur Jean Nicolet; in 1887 the City of Nicolet became the City of West De Pere; and in 1890 the City of West De Pere consolidated with the City of De Pere to form a single municipality.

St. Norbert College, which abuts the banks of the Fox River on the city's west side near the Claude Allouez Bridge, was founded by Norbertine Abbot Pennings in 1898.

Registered historic places
De Pere has several areas on the National Register of Historic Places. North Broadway Street Historic District is listed as #83003368. Large homes line Broadway, Ridgeway Blvd., Morris, Fulton, Franklin, Cass, Front, and Wisconsin Streets near the Fox River.

The De Pere Lock and Dam Historic District (#93001331) was added in 1993.

The Union Hotel was added to the list in 2003.

The Randall Avenue Historic District was added in 2007.

The Edwin and Jennie Gutknecht House was listed in 2015.

The St. Norbert College Historic District was added to the list in 2018.

The Mansion Street World War II Defense Housing Historic District and the Daviswood Ranch Homes Historic District were added to the list in 2021.

Geography

De Pere is located at  (44.4460910, −88.0740510).

Climate

Demographics

2020 census
As of the census of 2020, the population was 25,410. The racial makeup of the city was 87.9% White, 2.1% Asian, 1.9% Black or African American, 1.3% Native American, 0.1% Pacific Islander, 1.4% from other races, and 5.2% from two or more races. Ethnically, the population was 4.2% Hispanic or Latino of any race.

2010 census
As of the census of 2010, there were 23,800 people, 9,254 households, and 5,869 families living in the city. The racial makeup of the city was 94.0% White, 0.9% African American, 1.2% Native American, 1.5% Asian, 0.7% from other races, and 1.8% from two or more races. Hispanic or Latino of any race were 2.1% of the population.

There were 9,254 households, of which 33.2% had children under the age of 18 living with them, 49.4% were married couples living together, 9.9% had a female householder with no husband present, 4.1% had a male householder with no wife present, and 36.6% were non-families. 29.2% of all households were made up of individuals, and 10.8% had someone living alone who was 65 years of age or older. The average household size was 2.39 and the average family size was 2.97.

The median age in the city was 33.7 years. 23.8% of residents were under the age of 18; 14.1% were between the ages of 18 and 24; 26.4% were from 25 to 44; 23.9% were from 45 to 64; and 11.7% were 65 years of age or older. The gender makeup of the city was 47.9% male and 52.1% female.

2000 census
As of the census of 2000, there were 20,559 people, 7,724 households, and 5,020 families living in the city. The population density was 1,938.4 people per square mile (748.2/km2). There were 7,993 housing units at an average density of 753.6 per square mile (290.9/km2). The racial makeup of the city was 96.71% White, 0.54% African American, 0.92% Native American, 0.75% Asian, 0.03% Pacific Islander, 0.19% from other races, and 0.86% from two or more races. Hispanic or Latino of any race were 0.98% of the population.

There were 7,724 households, out of which 33.9% had children under the age of 18 living with them, 54.2% were married couples living together, 7.7% had a female householder with no husband present, and 35.0% were non-families. 27.6% of all households were made up of individuals, and 10.5% had someone living alone who was 65 years of age or older. The average household size was 2.46 and the average family size was 3.04.

In the city, the population was spread out, with 24.5% under the age of 18, 14.8% from 18 to 24, 30.8% from 25 to 44, 18.5% from 45 to 64, and 11.4% who were 65 years of age or older. The median age was 32 years. For every 100 females, there were 93.6 males. For every 100 females age 18 and over, there were 89.6 males.

The median income for a household in the city was $50,282, and the median income for a family was $61,688. Males had a median income of $39,710 versus $27,166 for females. The per capita income for the city was $24,013. About 2.3% of families and 4.0% of the population were below the poverty line, including 3.2% of those under the age of 18 and 5.4% of those 65 and older.

Religion
St. Mark Lutheran Church is a member of the Wisconsin Evangelical Lutheran Synod in De Pere.

The National Shrine of Saint Joseph is located at St. Norbert College.

St. Norbert Abbey is the mother canonry of the Premonstratensian Order in the United States.

Government

De Pere is represented by Mike Gallagher (R) in the United States House of Representatives, and by Ron Johnson (R) and Tammy Baldwin (D) in the United States Senate. André Jacque (R) represents De Pere in the Wisconsin State Senate, while Shae Sortwell (R) represents De Pere in the Wisconsin State Assembly.

De Pere has a mayor-council form of government with a full-time city administrator. The mayor is elected. The city council consists of eight alderpersons, two elected from each of four districts.  All elected officials serve two-year terms.

Education

De Pere is served by two school districts.

The Unified School District of De Pere has the following schools:
De Pere High School
De Pere Middle School
Foxview Intermediate School
Dickinson Elementary School
Heritage Elementary School
Altmayer Elementary School

The School District of West De Pere has the following schools:
West De Pere High School
West De Pere Middle School
West De Pere Intermediate School
Westwood Elementary School
Hemlock Creek Elementary School
Phantom Knight Charter School

De Pere Private Schools:
Notre Dame of De Pere
Our Lady of Lourdes

De Pere is also home to St. Norbert College, a private Roman Catholic liberal arts college.

Syble Hopp is a school for children ages 3–21 years old who have cognitive and other developmental disabilities. It is operated by the Brown County Children with Disabilities Education Board.

Transportation

Interstate 41 travels north–south on the west side of De Pere. Wisconsin Highway 32/Wisconsin Highway 57 enter De Pere from the south and split in the middle of De Pere. WIS 32 heads east–west through De Pere before turning north. WIS 57 continues straight north. There is limited transit service operated by Green Bay Metro and the CN provides freight railroad service. The Fox River is navigable for boat and canoe traffic with the exception of a dam.

Notable people

 Arthur J. Altmeyer, Commissioner of Social Security
 Jason Berken, MLB player
 Wilson Charles, athlete
 Robert John Cornell, Roman Catholic priest, former member of the United States House of Representatives
 Charles W. Day, Wisconsin State Senator
 Gary T. Dilweg, Wisconsin State Representative
 Burley Follett, former mayor of Green Bay, Wisconsin
 Paul Gigot, political commentator
 Earl Gilson, Wisconsin State Representative
 Charles Hall, Wisconsin State Representative
 Robert J. Havighurst, physicist
 Charlie Hill, comedian
 James F. Hughes, U.S. Representative
 Henry J. Janssen, Wisconsin State Representative
 Stephen King, Author
 Joseph Konopka, incarcerated terrorist known as "Dr. Chaos"
 Scott McCurley, NFL assistant coach
 Robert J. McGeehan, Wisconsin State Senator
 Terry Anne Meeuwsen, Miss America 1973, Miss Wisconsin 1972, co-host of the 700 Club, born in De Pere
 George F. Merrill, Wisconsin State Senator
 Enos Warren Persons, Wisconsin State Senator
 John Schneider, NFL executive
 Edward A. Seymour, Wisconsin State Representative
 Alexander H. Smith, mycologist
 Gale Staley, MLB player
 William J. Sweeney, Wisconsin State Representative

References

External links

City of De Pere Website
De Pere City Council
List of De Pere Mayors
Brief History of De Pere
List of De Pere Boards, Commissions & Committees
List of De Pere Parks
De Pere Maps

 
Cities in Wisconsin
Cities in Brown County, Wisconsin
Green Bay metropolitan area
Populated places established in 1857
1857 establishments in Wisconsin